Malavika Shivpuri is an Indian actress and voice dubbing artiste in Bollywood.

She has acted on Indian television in serials like Tu Kahe Agar, Kyunki Saas Bhi Kabhi Bahu Thi, Choodiyaan, Kahaani Ghar Ghar Kii and Viraasat. She also played a cameo as Sunny Deol's sister in Gadar: Ek Prem Katha.

She has dubbed for Bipasha Basu in Mere Yaar Ki Shaadi Hai and Meera in Nazar besides many other actresses in different films. Her mother Kanika Shivpuri is a character artiste in films and television.

Dubbing roles

Live action television series

Live action films

Animated films

References

Year of birth missing (living people)
Actresses in Hindi cinema
Actresses in Hindi television
Living people
Indian voice actresses
People from Delhi